The Épinette River is a tributary of the rivière aux Anglais flowing in the unorganized territory Rivière-aux-Outardes and the town of Baie-Comeau, in the Manicouagan Regional County Municipality, in the administrative region of Côte-Nord, in the province of Quebec, in Canada.

The Épinette river valley is served mainly by a forest road that goes up the valley and the English river path in the lower part.

The surface of the Épinette River is generally frozen from the beginning of December to the end of March, except the rapids areas; however, safe circulation on the ice is generally from mid-December to mid-March.

Geography 
The Épinette River rises on the Canadian Shield, at a small unidentified lake.

  to the south, first winding between the mountains when entering Baie-Comeau territory, until the outlet (coming from the northwest) of three small lakes, then meandering through a forest plain to the outlet (coming from the west) of Lac Bum and Gérin;
  eastwards to a stream (coming from the north), then forming a hook towards the south by winding around a mountain, to the discharge (coming from the west) from a small mountain lake, then east, to a bend in the river (in the marsh area), corresponding to the outlet (coming from the south) of Lac Saint-Joseph;
  north-east first in the marsh area, then crossing Lac Cinq Cents; then east to its mouth.

The Épinette river flows on the west shore of Lac Fer à Cheval, which is crossed to the southeast by the rivière aux Anglais, in the town of Baie-Comeau.

Toponym 
A map published in 1938 mentions "Épinette Creek" to designate this watercourse.

The toponym "Rivière Épinette" was formalized on August 2, 1974, at the Place Names Bank of the Commission de toponymie du Québec.

See also 
 
 List of rivers of Quebec

References

Further reading 
 .

Rivers of Côte-Nord
Manicouagan Regional County Municipality